Mixed-linkage glucan (MLG), sometimes incorrectly referred to as beta-glucan, is a hemicellulosic polysaccharide consisting of β-D(1-3) and β-D(1-4) linked glucosyl residues. MLG is highly prevalent within the Poales, where it has important properties in the diet. In addition, although thought to be confined to the Poales, MLG has been found to be highly prevalent in plants of the distantly related genus Equisetum.

Structure 

MLG is composed of β-D(1-3) and β-D(1-4)-linked glucosyl residues. Typically there are regions of 2-5 β-D(1-4)-linked residues separated by β-D(1-3)-linkages. The β-D(1-4)-linked residues form rigid regions of the structure while the β-D(1-3)-links are flexible.

Roles in the diet 
MLGs exhibit the physiological properties of dietary fibres and the functional properties of viscous and gel-forming food hydrocolloids.

Functions in plants 
The prevalence of MLG within the poales and Equisetum suggests a definite role in their growth. However the presence of the enzyme mixed-linkage glucan : xyloglucan endotransglucosylase within Equiseta suggest that the role of MLG in each may be different.

See also 

 Lichenin

References 

Polysaccharides